Prometopia is a genus of sap-feeding beetles in the family Nitidulidae. There are about five described species in Prometopia.

Species
These five species belong to the genus Prometopia:
 Prometopia bidentata Schaeffer, 1909
 Prometopia depilis Scudder, 1877
 Prometopia quadrimaculata Motschulsky, 1863
 Prometopia sexmaculata (Say, 1825)
 Prometopia unidentata Hisamatsu, 1959

References

Further reading

 
 

Nitidulidae
Articles created by Qbugbot